Patrick Edward Hannigan (March 5, 1936 – December 11, 2007) was a Canadian professional ice hockey left winger who played five seasons in the National Hockey League (NHL) with the Toronto Maple Leafs, New York Rangers and Philadelphia Flyers between 1959 and 1968. He later served as a television analyst for the Buffalo Sabres, where he was paired with Ted Darling, until his retirement from broadcasting in 1982.

Pat is the brother of Ray and Gord Hannigan and Colleen Yates. He was married to the former Lynn McCormick and had daughter Carey, and two sons, Ted and Bill.

Career statistics

Regular season and playoffs

Awards
 WHL Coast Division First All-Star Team (1959)
 AHL First All-Star Team (1965)

References

External links
 

1936 births
2007 deaths
Baltimore Clippers players
Buffalo Bisons (AHL) players
Buffalo Sabres announcers
Canadian expatriate ice hockey players in the United States
Canadian ice hockey left wingers
Ice hockey people from Ontario
National Hockey League broadcasters
New Westminster Royals players
New York Rangers players
Philadelphia Flyers players
Phoenix Roadrunners (WHL) players
Portland Buckaroos players
Rochester Americans players
Sportspeople from Timmins
Toronto Maple Leafs players
Toronto St. Michael's Majors players
Vancouver Canucks (WHL) players
Winnipeg Warriors (minor pro) players